Alexandra E. Witt (born April 9, 1961) is an American television news journalist based in New York City who currently hosts the television news program Alex Witt Reports from 12pm to 2pm on MSNBC, where she previously hosted MSNBC Live and Morning Joe First Look. Witt joined the network in January 1999.

Early life and education
Witt was born in Pasadena, California, and grew up in the Hancock Park neighborhood of Los Angeles. Witt's father is Dr. Charles B. Witt, a noted thoracic surgeon in Los Angeles. Witt graduated from the Marlborough School for Girls in Los Angeles and the University of Southern California, where she majored in journalism and international relations.

Career
Witt first served as a field producer for the Today Show in Burbank, California. Her first on-air job was at KCBA in Salinas, California. She later worked for KCBS-TV, KNBC-TV, and KABC-TV, each of which are located in communities adjacent to Los Angeles. She served as a reporter at KCBA from 1990–1992 and WNYW-TV from 1996–1998. In 1999, Witt was with MSNBC as an anchor. She hosts the weekend program Weekends with Alex Witt, which was later rebranded as MSNBC Reports.

Personal life
Witt is married to TV producer Bill Sorensen. Witt has noted on-air that she is related to George Washington. She is a second cousin, seven generations removed to George Washington through Bailey Washington, a cousin and contemporary of President Washington. She is a member of the National Society of Washington Family Descendants. She is a member of the band Mrs. Robinson.

See also 
 New Yorkers in journalism

References

External links
Weekends with Alex Witt on MSNBC

1961 births
Living people
American television reporters and correspondents
MSNBC people
University of Southern California alumni
Television anchors from Los Angeles
American women television journalists
USC Annenberg School for Communication and Journalism alumni